Yeniyürükkaş  is a very small village in Mersin district of Mersin Province, Turkey. The village is situated in the Taurus Mountains. The population of the Yeniyürükkaş was 45 as of 2012.

References

Villages in Aydıncık District (Mersin)